Saros cycle series 148 for lunar eclipses occurs at the moon's ascending node, 18 years 11 and 1/3 days. It contains 70 events.

See also 
 List of lunar eclipses
 List of Saros series for lunar eclipses

Notes

External links 
 www.hermit.org: Saros 148

Lunar saros series